Poetics is the fifth studio album by Mexican rock band Panda, released on 22 September 2009 through Movic Records and EMI Records.

The band produced the album with fellow keyboardist Marcelo Treviño, keeping the change in tone that was ignited in their third and fourth albums Para Ti Con Desprecio and Amantes Sunt Amentes, focusing on alternative elements such as pop rock and post-grunge.

It is a concept album divided in two discs (acts), narrating a story based on the interaction of a man with the devil, as well as a relationship towards emotions and the seven deadly sins. The album went on to sell over 60,000 copies, and since has been certified platinum in Mexico.

Production
After three years of absence and two after the release of their live album Sinfonía Soledad, the band decided to start producing new songs, but in a very different way. According to frontman Jose Madero, each member of the band was in a different part of the world, but they each recorded their own piece of music and sent it each one to another through the internet. Later, in early February, the band reunited on the studio El Cielo, in Monterrey, Nuevo León. Once there, they used not only their usual instruments, but also some that have never been used before. The album was completed between March and April 2009.

Promotion and tour
After completing the album, the band went on a mini-tour in Mexico and played three songs from the album: "Sólo A Terceros", "Abigaíl" and "Amnistía". Later, the band stopped the tour. They had signings throughout Latin America and in the United States as well, reaching cities like Los Angeles, California.

Release
It was expected to be released sometime between April or May, but the band had announced that the album would be released on 17 July. Near the release date, the band postponed the release to 22 August, and then to 22 September, which angered the fans. According to the band, it was not their decision, but their managers' and producers'.

Their first single was "Sólo A Terceros" and was released on radio stations on 22 July, and the official music video was released on 27 July, on the Mexican TV show Los 10+ Pedidos.

Track listing 

All lyrics are written by José Madero; all music is composed by Panda.

ACT I

ACT II

Personnel
Adapted from album liner notes:

Panda 
Jose Madero – vocals, guitar, ukulele
 Ricardo Treviño – bass
 Jorge Vazquez – drums
 Arturo Arredondo – lead guitar

Production / Session musicians 
 Panda – production
 Marcelo Treviño – production, piano, keyboards, orchestration, choirs
 Adrián "Rojo" Treviño – co-production, recording and mixing at ElCielo Recording Studios
 Francisco “Kiko” Lobo de la Garza – executive production
 Jaime Cavazos – mastering at OVU Studios
 Gil Elguezabal – recording assistant
 Gino Orona – recording assistant
 Beto Ramos – drum tech
 Oscar Rojas Mustelier – trumpet on "Popurri Para Ti"
 Alfonso Herrera – choirs on "Casi Nula Autoestima"
 Mario Videgaray  – art direction, design
 Adrián Pérez Acosta  – illustration

Charts

Certifications

References

2009 albums
Panda (band) albums
Concept albums